The official German Airplay Chart is an airplay chart compiled by Nielsen Music Controlon behalf of Bundesverband Musikindustrie (Federal Association of Phonographic Industry). In 2005, 19 different songs by 15 artists reached the top of the chart. Robbie Williams "Misunderstood" was the first number-one of the year. It was replaced by Söhne Mannheims "Und wenn ein Lied...", the following week.

Chart history

References

Germany airplay
Airplay 2005